Bernard St-Laurent (14 December 1953 – 22 January 2015) was a member of the House of Commons of Canada from 1993 to 1997. He has worked for government and correctional facilities.

He was elected in the Manicouagan electoral district under the Bloc Québécois party in the 1993 federal election, thus he served in the 35th Canadian Parliament. He did not seek a second term in office and therefore left Canadian politics following the 1997 federal election.

St-Laurent died on 22 January 2015.

References

External links
 

1953 births
2015 deaths
Bloc Québécois MPs
Members of the House of Commons of Canada from Quebec
Politicians from Saguenay, Quebec